Noa Szőllős (born 3 February 2003) is a female Hungarian-born Israeli alpine ski racer born in Budapest, Hungary.
Szőllős and her brother, alpine ski racer Barnabás Szőllős, were selected by the Olympic Committee of Israel to compete for Israel in the Beijing 2022 Winter Olympics.
Noa Szőllős became the youngest Israeli to medal at the 2020 Winter Youth Olympics when she was 16, taking home silver and bronze in alpine events. 

Her favorite event in alpine skiing is the giant slalom.

Her oldest brother is fellow alpine ski racer Benjamin Szőllős.

References

External links
 
 Skiing siblings to represent Israel at Winter Olympics – Forward
 Skier snags Israel’s first Winter Youth Olympics medals – ISRAEL21c
 Noa Szollos – The Times of Israel
 
 Meet athletes set to represent Israel at 2022 Winter Games – ynetnews.com
 The skiing family representing Israel at the Beijing Olympics – i24NEWS
 

Israeli female alpine skiers
Hungarian female alpine skiers
2003 births
Living people
People from Budapest
Alpine skiers at the 2020 Winter Youth Olympics
Medalists at the 2020 Winter Youth Olympics
Alpine skiers at the 2022 Winter Olympics
Olympic alpine skiers of Israel
Hungarian people of Israeli descent